John 20:27 is the twenty-seventh verse of the twentieth chapter of the Gospel of John in the New Testament. It records Jesus' reappearance to the disciples, including Thomas, eight days after his resurrection.

Content
The original Koine Greek, according to the Textus Receptus, reads:

In the King James Version of the Bible it is translated as:
Then saith he to Thomas, Reach hither thy finger, and behold my hands; and reach hither thy hand, and thrust it into my side: and be not faithless, but believing.

The modern World English Bible translates the passage as:
Then he said to Thomas, "Reach here your finger, and see my hands. Reach here your hand, and put it into my side. Don't be unbelieving, but believing."

For a collection of other versions see BibleHub John 20:27

Analysis
Right after the greeting of "Peace" (John 20:26), Jesus immediately directed his attention to 'the main church problem at hand: Thomas's doubt'. Jesus granted Thomas's demands to verify his crucifixion, marks: the marks of the nails in Jesus' hands and the pierced hole on his side. It surely shocked Thomas that Jesus knows exactly his problem as every letter of his requirements for physical verification (John 20:25) is met and spoken back to him with uncanny precision.

The repetition of his wording, and the shown sympathy to his misgivings, must have left deep impression to Thomas, leading to the response in John 20:28.

References

Sources

External links
Jesus Appears to His Disciples

20:27
John 20:27